Vantage Bank Texas, formerly San Antonio National Bank is a financial institution headquartered in San Antonio, Texas. It serves businesses and consumers in the Rio Grande Valley, San Antonio, Laredo, El Paso, Hondo and Refugio.

History
On February 12, 2012, San Antonio National Bank changed its name to Vantage Bank Texas .

On November 27, 2018, Inter National Bank and Vantage Bank Texas merged. The consolidation, which was to operate under Vantage Bank Texas, created a community bank with $1.9 billion in total assets.

References

1923 establishments in Texas
Banks based in Texas
Banks established in 1923
Companies based in San Antonio